The Ulster Council is a provincial council of the Gaelic Athletic Association sports of hurling, Gaelic football, camogie, and handball in the province of Ulster. The headquarters of the Ulster GAA is based in the city of Armagh.

The first Ulster GAA Convention was held on 22 March 1903 in Armagh. Belfast solicitor George Martin was elected as first president with L. F. O'Kane (Derry) as first secretary. Victor O'Nolan (Tyrone), the father of writer Flann O'Brien, was elected vice-president. Danny Murphy (Down) has been Ulster Council secretary and chief executive officer since 1998. Murphy is a former vice president of the GAA and president of Ulster GAA. On 4 July 2012, Murphy was awarded an Honorary Doctorate for Services to Sport and Community Relations.

County boards
 

Antrim
Armagh
Cavan
Derry
Donegal
Down
Fermanagh
Monaghan
Tyrone

Football

Provincial team
The Ulster provincial football team represents the province of Ulster in Gaelic football. The team competes in the Railway Cup.

Players

Players from the following county teams represent Ulster: Antrim, Armagh, Derry, Donegal, Down, Fermanagh, Monaghan and Tyrone.

Competitions

Inter-county

Club

All-time top scorers from Ulster county teams
As of 3 June 2008 according to the BBC.

Notes
Includes Ulster Championship, All-Ireland Championship and Qualifiers.

All-time top goalscorers from Ulster county teams
As of 15 June 2008, according to the Sunday Tribune.

Notes:
Includes Ulster Championship, All-Ireland Championship and Qualifiers.

Hurling

Provincial team
The Ulster provincial hurling team represents the province of Ulster in hurling. The team competes in the Railway Cup.

Players

Competitions

Inter-county

Ulster has always been the weakest of the provinces in hurling terms, possibly due to the difference between the hurling promulgated by the early Gaelic Athletic Association and the "commons" game played in Ulster. The Ulster hurling team have only won four Railway Cup semi-final games in their history (1945, 1992, 1993 and 1995), it, however, lost in each of those Railway Cup deciders.

There have been some successes over the years, mostly by Antrim teams:
 1943: Antrim defeated Galway and Kilkenny, but lost to Cork in the All-Ireland Senior Hurling Championship final
 1982: Gerry Goodwin (Tyrone) won the All-Ireland Poc Fada Championship
 1983: Loughgiel Shamrocks (Antrim) won the All-Ireland Senior Club Hurling Championship
 1989: Antrim defeated Offaly, and subsequently lost to Tipperary in the All-Ireland final
 2010: Graham Clarke (Down) won the All-Ireland Poc Fada Championship

Club
 Ulster Senior Club Hurling Championship
 Ulster Intermediate Club Hurling Championship
 Ulster Junior Club Hurling Championship
 Ulster Under-21 Club Hurling Championship

"Team Ulster" in the Liam MacCarthy Cup
In 2020, a concept was discussed among players and managers, with a proposal that a combined "Team Ulster" would compete in the Liam MacCarthy Cup.

Grades

Camogie

Gael Linn Cup
The Ulster camogie team has twice won the premier representative competition in the women's team field sport of camogie, the Gael Linn Cup, in 1967 and 2007.

Gael Linn Trophy
The Ulster provincial junior camogie team won the Gael Linn Trophy on eight occasions: 1979, 1989, 1990, 1991, 1993, 1998, 2000 and 2002.

Honours
 Disability Sport NI's Inclusive Sport Award: 2021

References

External links
Ulster Council website

 
1903 establishments in Ireland
 
 
 
Provincial councils of the Gaelic Athletic Association
Gaelic
Sports organizations established in 1903